The Somaliland Scouts was a Rayid military unit, a regiment, of the British Army. It was established after the liberation of British Somaliland from Italy in December 1941 and the dissolution of the Somaliland Camel Corps in 1942, which was formerly tasked with the defense of the protectorate.

History
Originally formed as the Somali Guard Battalion, and tasked with defending the border between British and French Somaliland, the brigade quickly rose in size and importance. 

It later became the Somali Companies in June 1942, before finally being renamed to the Somaliland Scouts in August 1943.

A transcript of a Reuters report of 26 June 1960 says that, during the independence ceremony for Somaliland "..Nearly 1,000 British-trained Somaliland Scouts were then handed over to the Prime Minister by Brigadier O. G. Brooks, the Colonel Commandant."

On 1 July 1960, upon the merger of British Somaliland and Italian Somaliland to form the Somali Republic, the Somaliland Scouts was merged with former Italian-raised police forces from the south to become the nucleus for the new Somali National Army.

See also

 Somaliland Army

References

 

British colonial regiments
Military history of Somaliland
Military units and formations of British Somaliland in World War II
East African campaign (World War II)
Military units and formations established in 1942
Military units and formations disestablished in 1960
1942 establishments in the British Empire
1960 disestablishments in the British Empire
1960 disestablishments in Somalia